Al-Dawwara was a Palestinian Arab village in the Safad Subdistrict. It was depopulated during the 1948 War on May 25, 1948, by the Palmach's First Battalion of Operation Yiftach. It was located 27 km northeast of Safad, bordering three rivers that flowed into lake al-Hula: the al-Hasbani, Banyas, and Dan rivers.

In 1945 the village had a population of 1,100 (this figure included 400 Jewish residents of the Kibbutzim ‘Amir and Sde Nehemia).

History

British Mandate era
According to the  1931 census of Palestine, one Christian lived there, and the remainder were Muslim. Most of the residents were farmers.

In 1939 the Kibbutz ‘Amir was founded nearby, and Sde Nechemya in 1940.

In the 1944/45 statistics Dawwara had population of 700 Muslims, where Arabs owned 2,753 dunams of land. Of this, they used 68 dunums  to the growing of citrus fruits and bananas, 281 for  cereals, 2,135 dunums for plantations and irrigable land,  while 52 dunams was built-up (urban) area.

The older parts of the village had narrow streets. Most of the houses were  adobe, with a few of basalt.

1948, aftermath
On receiving news of an imminent attack on the village by Operation Yiftach, many villagers fled on May 25, 1948, but some sources have indicated that some military force in practice was used to drive out the Arabs from the village.

In 1992 the village site was described: "There are hardly any traces of the village left, only a few building stones at the edge of a fish pond remain on the site. The entire area has been converted into a fish hatchery."

References

Bibliography

External links
 Welcome To al-Dawwara
al-Dawwara, Zochrot
Al-Dawwara, Villages of Palestine

Arab villages depopulated during the 1948 Arab–Israeli War
District of Safad